"Ever Since the World Began" is a power ballad by American rock band Survivor, released in 1982 from the group's third album Eye of the Tiger. Composed by the band's guitarist Frankie Sullivan and keyboardist Jim Peterik, the song was written for someone fighting against cancer; Frankie Sullivan said in an interview that a member of his immediate family was battling the disease and later succumbed to it. He said the song had a lot of true meaning to him.  It also had a lot of significance for co-writer Jim Peterik, as it was one of the final songs he played for his father before the latter's death shortly before the Eye of the Tiger album's release.

Other versions

Styx member Tommy Shaw recorded his version of the song for his third solo album Ambition in 1987. It was released as a single and reached No. 75 on the U.S. Billboard Hot 100.

Following the temporary disbandment of Survivor in 1989, Bickler's successor in the band, Jimi Jamison recorded a solo cover of "Ever Since the World Began" for the 1989 film Lock Up. It was released as his debut solo single.

References

1982 songs
1987 singles
1989 debut singles
Survivor (band) songs
Jimi Jamison songs
Rock ballads
Songs written by Frankie Sullivan
Songs written by Jim Peterik
Atlantic Records singles
Scotti Brothers Records singles